Fahrenholzia pinnata is a species of louse. Its typical host is a rodent.

References

Polyplacidae
Parasites of rodents
Insects described in 1915